Marat Salyanski (born 29 May 1974), is an Azerbaijani futsal player who plays for Araz Naxçivan and the Azerbaijan national futsal team.

References

External links
UEFA profile

1974 births
Living people
Futsal goalkeepers
Azerbaijani men's futsal players
Araz Naxçivan players